GSK-3-binding protein FRAT2 is a protein that in humans is encoded by the FRAT2 gene.

The protein encoded by this intronless gene belongs to the GSK-3-binding protein family. Studies show that this protein plays a role as a positive regulator of the WNT signaling pathway. It may be upregulated in tumor progression.

References

Further reading